Gaya–Kamakhya Weekly Express is an Express train of the Indian Railways connecting  in Bihar and   in Assam. It is currently being operated with 15619/15620 train numbers on once in week basis.

Service

The 15619/Gaya–Kamakhya Weekly Express has an average speed of 46 km/hr and covers 1071 km in 23 hrs 20 mins. 15620/Kamakhya–Gaya Weekly Express has an average speed of 47 km/hr and covers  1071 km in 22 hrs 40 mins.

Route and halts 

The important halts of the train are :

BIHAR
 
 
 
 
 
 
 

JHARKHAND
 
 

WEST BENGAL
 
 
 New Jalpaiguri (Siliguri)
 
 

ASSAM
 
 
 Goalpara Town

Schedule

Rake sharing
15621/15622 – Kamakhya–Anand Vihar Weekly Express

Traction

Rake maintenance 

The train is maintained by the Guwahati Coaching Depot. The same rake is used for Kamakhya–Anand Vihar Weekly Express for one way which is altered by the second rake on the other way.

Coach composition

The train consists of 21 coaches:

 5 AC III Tier
 1 AC II Tier
 10 Sleeper coaches
 3 General
 2 EOG

References

External links 

 15619/Gaya-Kamakhya Weekly Express
 15620/Kamakhya-Gaya Weekly Express

Transport in Gaya, India
Transport in Guwahati
Rail transport in Assam
Rail transport in West Bengal
Rail transport in Bihar
Express trains in India